Arnaud Cordier (born in Dijon on November 26, 1974) is a draughts player who has been French national champion multiple times, from 1996 to 2013. He is currently France's top-rated player.

References 

French draughts players
Players of international draughts
1974 births
Living people
Sportspeople from Dijon